Leo Brent Bozell III (born July 14, 1955) is an American conservative activist who founded an organization called the Media Research Center whose stated purpose is to identify alleged liberal media bias.

Bozell has been published in various local and national media outlets. However, beginning in 2014, multiple Media Research Center employees began publicly revealing that Bozell's writings have actually been ghostwritten by others.

Education
Bozell received a Bachelor of Arts in history from the University of Dallas in 1977.

Career
He joined a since-disbanded organization called the National Conservative Political Action Committee, where he worked for the group's founder, Terry Dolan, to help elect conservative politicians.  In 1987, he resigned from the organization to start the Media Research Center.

Parents Television Council

Bozell founded the Parents Television and Media Council in 1995, initially as a branch of the Media Research Center focusing on entertainment television, after saying that he felt that decency was declining on prime-time television programming. The PTC's stated mission was "to promote and restore responsibility and decency to the entertainment industry."

Settling WWE libel charges
In 2001, the PTC also organized a mass advertiser boycott of the professional wrestling television program WWE SmackDown on UPN over claims that the program caused the deaths of young children whom the PTC felt were influenced by watching the program; in particular, the PTC cited the case of Lionel Tate, a 12-year-old Ft. Lauderdale boy who was arrested after murdering a 6-year-old girl. Tate's attorney claimed that he had accidentally killed her when he botched a professional wrestling move. It was ultimately determined that the girl had been stomped to death and had not been the victim of any professional wrestling move and was actually watching cartoons at the time the murder occurred. World Wrestling Federation (now World Wrestling Entertainment, or WWE) sued Bozell and his organization for libel. PTC's insurance carrier eventually chose to settle the case, paying $3.5 million to the WWE, and issuing a public apology.

In Bozell's mandated apology as part of settling the libel charges, Bozell said: "It was premature to reach that conclusion when we did, and there is now ample evidence to show that conclusion was incorrect. It was wrong to have stated or implied that WWE or any of its programs caused these tragic deaths."

The same year, Bozell and the PTC were criticized in a book, Foley is Good: And the Real World Is Faker Than Wrestling, a memoir published by former WWE wrestler Mick Foley, who questioned the reasoning and research PTC used to associate SmackDown with violent acts performed by children watching the program.

During his tenure as PTC president, Bozell filed complaints with the FCC over what he alleged were indecent programs and attempted boycotts against advertisers on television programs the organization alleged were offensive. PTC was one of many organizations that filed complaints over the 2004 Super Bowl XXXVIII halftime show in which co-performer Justin Timberlake caused a brief exposure of Janet Jackson's right breast for which the FCC ultimately fined CBS. Excluding Super Bowl-related complaints, the vast majority of FCC complaints from 2003 to 2006 were found to have come from PTC.

Media Research Center

Before founding the MRC in 1987, Bozell ran the National Conservative Foundation project at the Conservative Political Action Conference, in which he moderated debates between Sam Donaldson and Robert Novak over media bias.

In 1998, Bozell founded an organization called the Conservative Communications Center. The MRC also established CNSNews, the site of the Conservative News Service later becoming known as Cybercast News Service, as well as numerous other MRC-affiliated web sites. On its website, MRC publishes Bozell's syndicated columns, the CyberAlert daily newsletter documenting perceived media bias, and research reports on the news media.

In October 2006, Bozell founded the Culture and Media Institute, an MRC branch whose mission is to reduce what he claims to be a negative liberal influence on American morality, culture, and religious liberty.

Views and controversies

Allegations of racial insensitivity
Bozell has been accused of making racially insensitive statements. On December 22, 2011, he appeared on a Fox News Channel segment and asked how media would react if someone said that President Barack Obama looks like a "skinny ghetto crackhead", after being showed a clip in which an MSNBC journalist said a Republican candidate looks like a "car bomber".

Ghostwriting scandal
In February 2014, former employees of the Media Research Center alleged that Bozell does not write his own columns or books and instead has used a ghostwriter, Tim Graham, for years. One newspaper, the Quad-City Times (Iowa) dropped Bozell's column as a result, saying, "Bozell may have been comfortable representing others' work as his own. We're not. The latest disclosure convinces us Bozell has no place on our print or web pages."

"Employees at the MRC were never under any illusion that Bozell had been writing his own copy. 'It’s an open secret at the office that Graham writes Bozell’s columns, and has done so for years,' said one former employee. In fact, a former MRC employee went so far as to tell The Daily Beast: 'I know for a fact that Bozell didn’t even read any of the drafts of his latest book until after it had been sent to the publishers'," a Daily Beast article on Bozell's ghostwriting scandal reported.

Views on Donald Trump
Bozell was an outspoken critic of Donald Trump during the 2016 Republican Party presidential primaries, describing him as "the greatest charlatan of them all," a "huckster," and a "shameless self-promoter". He said, "God help this country if this man were president."

After Trump clinched the Republican nomination, however, Bozell attacked the media for their alleged "hatred" of Trump. Politico noted, "The paradox here is that Bozell was once more antagonistic toward the president than any journalist." Bozell singled out Jake Tapper of CNN for being "one of the worst offenders" in coverage of Trump.

In August 2020, Bozell told a meeting of conservatives and donors that leftists planned to "steal this election." On January 6, after a mob of Trump supporters – including Bozell's son, L. Brent Bozell IV – attacked the United States Capitol, Bozell appeared on Fox Business Network and denounced the riot, stating that "you can never countenance police being attacked. You cannot countenance our national Capitol being breached like this. I think it is absolutely wrong.” Bozell also said that "Look, they are furious that they believe this election was stolen. I agree with them."

To date, Bozell, Graham, or other designees of Bozell have written five books published under Bozell's name covering the news media:
 And That's the Way it Isn't: A Reference Guide to Media Bias (with Brent Baker) (1990)
 Weapons of Mass Distortion: The Coming Meltdown of the Liberal Media (2004)
 Whitewash: How The News Media Are Paving Hillary Clinton's Path to the Presidency (with Tim Graham) (2007)
 Collusion: How The Media Stole The 2012 Election And How To Stop Them From Doing It In 2016 (with Tim Graham) (2013)
 Unmasked: Big Media's War on Trump (with Tim Graham) (2019)

Personal life
Bozell is one of ten children of L. Brent Bozell Jr. and Patricia Buckley Bozell. He is a nephew of former conservative writer and National Review founder William F. Buckley Jr. and former United States Senator James L. Buckley through Buckley's sister, Patricia, and is a grandson of William Frank Buckley Sr. He is of Irish, German, and English descent. Bozell's father was William Buckley Jr.'s debating partner at Yale University and a conservative activist; his grandfather  Leo B. Bozell was a co-founder of  Bozell Worldwide. Bozell III is married to Norma Petruccione and they have five children and ten grandchildren. Bozell has stated that contrary to speculation by some in the media, he is not officially a Republican.

Bozell was named the 1998 Alumnus of the Year at the University of Dallas. That same year, Grove City College named Bozell a Pew Memorial Lecturer.

Bozell's son David is director of an organization called ForAmerica, a conservative group active on social media, founded by Bozell III in 2010. His other son, Leo Brent Bozell IV, participated in the 2021 United States Capitol attack where he entered the floor of the United States Senate. He was federally charged with obstructing an official proceeding, entering a restricted building, and disorderly conduct.

References

External links
 

1955 births
Living people
American political activists
American political writers
American people of Irish descent
Catholics from Virginia
Buckley family
Grove City College
National Review people
Journalists from Washington, D.C.
Journalistic scandals
University of Dallas alumni
Human Events people
American media critics
21st-century American male writers
American people of English descent
American people of German descent
21st-century American non-fiction writers
American male non-fiction writers